"The Night Is Still Young" is a 2009 song performed by German singer Sandra featuring Thomas Anders. The song was written by Toby Gad and Audrey Martells, and produced by Jens Gad. It was released in May 2009 as the second single from Sandra's ninth studio album Back to Life and was moderately successful on the German singles chart. The CD single also includes Sandra's solo version of the song as well as the English-French track "Redis moi" available only on the digital edition of Back to Life. The music video for "The Night Is Still Young" was filmed in Ibiza by Susanne Sigi.

Track listing
CD maxi single/digital download
"The Night Is Still Young" – 3:22
"The Night Is Still Young" (Casa Sylt Mix) – 4:45
"The Night Is Still Young" (Solo Version) – 3:22
"Redis moi" – 3:45

Charts

References

External links
 "The Night Is Still Young" at Discogs
 The official Sandra channel at YouTube

2009 singles
2009 songs
Sandra (singer) songs
Song recordings produced by Jens Gad
Songs written by Toby Gad
Thomas Anders songs
Virgin Records singles
Male–female vocal duets